Ungku Abdul Aziz bin Ungku Abdul Hamid (28 January 1922 – 15 December 2020) was a Malaysian economist and lecturer. He was the 3rd Vice-Chancellor of the University of Malaya from 1968 to 1988 and the 1st General Director of the Council on Language and Literature of Malaysia from 1956 until 1957. He was awarded the title of Royal Professor (Profesor Diraja) in 1978.

Early life, family and education 
He was born into the Johor Royal Family. His father, Ungku Abdul Hamid Ungku Abdul Majid was a Malayan prince and military officer. He was a cousin of Syed Muhammad Naquib al-Attas and Syed Hussein Alatas as well as Sultan Ibrahim of Johor on his father's side. His father was of Malay and Turkish-(Circassian) descent, while his mother was English.

He graduated from the English college at Johore Bahru and the Malay school in Batu Pahat. He received Diploma in Arts from Raffles College, Singapore (now University of Malaya) and Bachelor of Arts in economics at University of Malaya, Singapore (now University of Malaya in Kuala Lumpur) in 1951. He then defended his doctoral dissertation in Waseda University (Tokyo, Japan) in 1964.

His daughter, Zeti Akhtar Aziz, was the former governor of Bank Negara Malaysia, Malaysia's central bank.

Academic career 
He worked in the state administration of Johore, in 1952–1961 as a lecturer at the University of Malaya (Singapore), with a one-year break, when he headed the Council on Language and Literature of Malaysia.

In the years 1962–1965, he was a professor and dean of the Faculty of Economics of the University of Malaya (Kuala Lumpur), while in 1968–1988, he was promoted to vice-chancellor of this university. He was the first Malaysian to become the vice-chancellor of University of Malaya. On his initiative, the university created the Botanical Garden, the Museum of Asian Art, the cooperative bookstore.
He is the author of the economic justification of a number of industrial projects, more than 50 books and monographs on social and economic problems of Malaysia, consultant to UN specialized organizations (ILO, UNESCO, UN Economic Commission for Asia and the Far East).

On 17 June 1978, he was awarded the rank and title of Royal Professor (Profesor Diraja) by the Yang di-Pertuan Agong of Malaysia and he was the only person in Malaysia to hold that rank.

Awards 
 Rank of the Royal Professor (1978) (awarded by the Yang di-Pertuan Agong of Malaysia) (only in Malaysia) 
 Japan Foundation Award (1981) 
 The Fukuoka Prize (1993)
 The title of "Outstanding Figure of the Islamic era" (1997) (awarded by the Yang di-Pertuan Agong of Malaysia)
 The title of "Outstanding Figure of the National Cooperative Movement" (2002)
 The Outstanding Malay Figure Award (2005)
 National Academic Award (2006)
 National Merdeka Award (2008)
 Rochdale Award (2009)

Death
Ungku Aziz died in Prince Court Medical Centre, Kuala Lumpur at 4:30 in the evening due to old age. He was 98 and is survived by his wife, Rahaiah Baheran and his only daughter, Zeti Akhtar Aziz. He was laid to rest at the Bukit Kiara Muslim Cemetery, Kuala Lumpur.

Namesakes
Several places were named after him, including:
Sekolah Menengah Kebangsaan Ungku Aziz (SMKUA), Sabak Bernam, Selangor
Balai Ungku Aziz, Faculty of Dentistry, University of Malaya
Kolej Kediaman Ungku Aziz, 11th residential college at the University of Malaya
Jalan Prof Diraja Ungku Aziz, formerly known as Jalan Universiti and named in his honour in late 2020

References

Bibliography 
 Abu Bakar A. Hamid, K. T. Joseph. The University at Pantai Valley: Glimpses of the past. Kuala Lumpur: UM Press, 2009

External links
 List of former Vice Chancellors of University of Malaya

1922 births
2020 deaths
House of Temenggong of Johor
Vice-chancellors of universities in Malaysia
Malaysian economists
Malaysian people of Malay descent
Malaysian Muslims
Malaysian people of Circassian descent
Malaysian people of English descent
Malaysian people of Turkish descent
Academic staff of the University of Malaya
Waseda University alumni
Citizens of Malaysia through descent
University of Malaya alumni